AGS may refer to:

Organizations

Businesses 
AGS (motorcycle manufacturer), a motocross bicycle manufacturer
AGS Entertainment, a film production company in India
Alabama Great Southern Railroad, US
Automobiles Gonfaronnaises Sportives, a defunct Formula 1 team

Educational institutions

United Kingdom 
Aberdeen Grammar School, Scotland
Acklam Grange School, Middlesbrough, England
Adams' Grammar School, Newport, Shropshire, England
Alcester Grammar School, Warwickshire, England
Antrim Grammar School, County Antrim, Northern Ireland
Aylesbury Grammar School, Buckinghamshire, England

Elsewhere 
Alaqsite'w Gitpu School, Listuguj, Quebec, Canada
Alliance Graduate School, Quezon City, Philippines
American Graduate School in Paris, France
American Graduate School of International Relations and Diplomacy, Paris, France
Arkansas Governor's School, Conway, Arkansas, U.S.
Auckland Grammar School, New Zealand

Government and politics 
 Alberta Geological Survey, Canada
 An Garda Síochána, the Irish police force 
 Australian Government Solicitor

Societies 
Alpha Gamma Sigma (honor society)
American Gem Society
American Geographical Society
American Geriatrics Society
Atlantic Geoscience Society

Other organizations 
Alpha Gamma Sigma (fraternity)

Places 
 Argyle Street railway station, Glasgow, Scotland
 Augusta Regional Airport in Augusta, Georgia, US

Science and technology

Medicine 
Acute grass sickness, a  horse disease
Adrenogenital syndrome
Aicardi–Goutières syndrome, a rare genetic disorder

Military technology 
 AGS-17, the Soviet-designed automatic grenade launcher
 AGS-30, successor of AGS-17
 Advanced Gun System
 Airborne Ground Surveillance, a class of military airborne radar systems
 Alliance Ground Surveillance
 Armored Gun System, or the M8 Armored Gun System light tank
 Surveying ship, in the US Navy hull classification system

Other uses in science and technology 
 Adventure Game Studio, a development tool for graphic adventure games
 AGS-101, a back-lit model of the Game Boy Advance SP
 Alternating Gradient Synchrotron, a particle accelerator
 Annualized Geothermal Solar, a passive building heating technology
 Apollo Abort Guidance System, a backup computer providing abort capability on the Apollo Lunar Module
 Silver sulfide (Ag2S)

Other uses 
 American Government Simulation, a government simulation game
 The Esimbi language (ISO 639-3 code asi)

See also 
 Aggies (disambiguation)